The Dupleix class consisted of three armored cruisers built for the French Navy at the beginning of the 20th century. Designed for overseas service and armed with eight  guns, the three ships of the class were smaller and less powerfully armed than their predecessors.

 was initially assigned to the Atlantic Division as its flagship. Her sister ships were initially assigned to the Mediterranean Squadron, although  relieved Dupleix as flagship of the Atlantic Division in 1905. Dupleix was reduced to reserve from 1906 to 1909 before she was sent to the Far East in 1910 as the flagship of the ships there. Desaix and  exchanged assignments in 1907, although the former ship returned to the Atlantic in 1908 before being placed in reserve from 1909 to 1914. Kléber was also placed in reserve in 1909, but she was reactivated two years later to join Dupleix in the Far East before returning home in 1913 to be placed in reserve again.

As tensions rose shortly before the beginning of World War I in August 1914, both Desaix and Kléber were reactivated. When the war began they were assigned to defend Allied shipping in the English Channel and intercept German ships attempting to pass through. At that time, Dupleix was still in the Far East. Before she was transferred to the Eastern Mediterranean in May 1915, the ship spent most of her time on escort duty in the Indian Ocean and Red Sea. Joined by Kléber that same month, they were two of the ships tasked to blockade the Aegean coast of Ottoman Turkey. Desaix was the first of the sisters to be transferred to the Mediterranean in February 1915 and spent the next year patrolling off the coast of the Ottoman Levant and in the central Mediterranean.

To help protect Allied shipping from German commerce raiders, the sisters were transferred to French West Africa for convoy escort duties in mid-1916 and remained there for the next year. Personnel shortages caused Kléber to be ordered home in mid-1917, but she struck a naval mine laid by a German submarine in June and sank; most of her crew was rescued by ships in the area. Dupleix followed her home in October and was placed in reserve. Desaix remained  in West Africa for the rest of the war.

Dupleix was decommissioned in 1919 and Desaix was transferred to the Far East that same year. After the latter's return in 1921, she was also decommissioned. Dupleix was sold for scrap in 1922 and Desaix followed five years later.

Background
French cruiser policy during the decade from the mid-1880s was incoherent as three different factions of the navy fought amongst themselves in four forums, the Navy Ministry, the Budgetary Committee of the Chamber of Deputies, the Supreme Naval Council that proposed shipbuilding programs and ship characteristics to the Navy Minister, and the Board of Construction that was responsible for evaluating ship designs.

After rejecting a repeat  protected cruiser like  in the 1896 budget, Lockroy and his allies in the Budget Committee were willing to accept smaller cruisers in the following year's budget. The  rejected Besnard's proposal for a  protected cruiser in late 1896, saying that the navy "needed ships that can deal out and withstand punishment", but Besnard authorized construction of  a few weeks later in the 1897 budget proposal anyway.

In the meantime, the Superior Naval Council had produced a new naval program that included an additional three each armored and protected cruisers for overseas service and five armored cruisers for service with the battle fleet. For the 1898 budget, Besnard proposed one battleship, two armored cruisers and two protected cruisers, but Lockroy and his allies, probably influenced by the ideas of Vice Admiral François Ernest Fournier, who believed that most cruiser tasks, including commerce raiding, would be better performed by armored cruisers smaller than Jeanne d'Arc, deleted the battleship and offered him 120 million francs for armored cruisers. He countered with a revised program of three armored cruisers for overseas duties, which became the Dupleix class, and three  armored cruisers for the fleet. This satisfied the Superior Naval Council's objectives and all three factions as Fourier's ideas showed that armored cruisers could accomplish the 's preferred strategy of commerce raiding. It also neatly consumed the Budget Committee's 120 million francs as each of the Dupleixs cost about 19 million francs and the Gueydons 21 million francs.

Preliminary design work in December 1896 was for a  ship armed with ten  guns, two in single-gun turrets fore and aft of the superstructure and the remaining eight in casemates, protected by a  waterline armor belt. The  thought that the belt protection was too weak and that the ships needed more endurance. The naval architect Louis-Émile Bertin, recently appointed as the Director of Naval Construction, agreed and revised the design, sacrificing one pair of guns for more armor and additional coal, which increased its displacement. The  accepted his revised design on 4 May 1897, although complaining about the deleted guns.

Dupleix was ordered from one of the naval dockyards on 18 December and orders for the other two followed on 28 December. Six months later, the  proposed revising the armament, exchanging the single-gun turrets and the casemated guns for four twin-gun turrets, two replacing the turrets on the centerline and two wing turrets, one on each broadside, and adding four  guns in casemates. By this time, preliminary work had already begun on Dupleix and Lockroy, recently returned to office, suggested suspending work on the ships while studies were done. Bertin opposed the changes, but produced drawings by early March 1899, despite the work load on his designers who were focused on other projects, and they were approved by the Minister on 6 April. The changes greatly retarded the progress on the two ships ordered from private dockyards, which had already been laid down in early 1899.

Design and description
The Dupleix-class ships were much smaller and more lightly armed than Jeanne d'Arc. The cruisers displaced  as designed. To reduce biofouling, their hulls were sheathed in teak. The ships normally had a crew of 19 officers and 550 enlisted men, but accommodated 24 officers and 583 enlisted men when serving as flagships.

The ships' propulsion machinery consisted of three vertical triple-expansion steam engines, each driving a single propeller shaft, using steam provided by water-tube boilers, but the types of machinery differed between them.

Armament
The ships of the Dupleix class had a main armament that consisted of eight quick-firing (QF) 45-caliber Canon de 164 mm Modèle 1893–96 guns. They were mounted in four twin-gun turrets, one each fore and aft of the superstructure and a pair of wing turrets amidships. Each gun was provided with 200 rounds, of which 44 shells were stowed in the turrets, which it could fire at a rate of three rounds per minute.

The cruisers' secondary armament consisted of four 45-caliber QF Canon de 100 mm Modèle de 1893 guns on single mounts in unprotected casemates in the hull. The sisters carried 250 rounds for each gun. For defense against torpedo boats, they carried ten  and four  Hotchkiss guns, all of which were on single mounts. The ship were also equipped with two above-water  torpedo tubes, one on each broadside.

Protection

Behind the belt armor was a highly-subdivided watertight internal cofferdam. The sides of the elliptical conning tower were 100 to 120 millimeters thick.

Ships

Service history
The first ship completed, Dupleix, was initially assigned to the Atlantic Division as its flagship. Her sisters were initially assigned to the Mediterranean Squadron's Light Squadron, although Desaix relieved Dupleix as flagship of the Atlantic Division in 1905.  In her turn Kléber relieved Desaix as flagship of the Atlantic Division in 1907. Desaix took Klébers place in the Light Squadron. While visiting the United States later that year, the cruiser accidentally collided with and sank an American cargo ship and participated in the Jamestown Exposition, celebrating the tercentenary of the founding of Jamestown, Virginia. At the beginning of 1908, Kléber became flagship of the Moroccan Division.

The sisters all spent significant amounts of time before 1914 in reserve. Dupleix from 1906 to 1909, Desaix from 1909 to 1914 and Kléber in 1909–1910 and 1913–1914. Dupleix was reactivated in 1910 to serve as the flagship of the Far Eastern Division and was joined by Kléber in 1911–1912. Dupleix was replaced as flagship in 1913 by the larger and more spacious, albeit older, armored cruiser .

World War I
After the French declaration of war on Imperial Germany in early August 1914, Dupleix was assigned to the British China Squadron and participated in the early stages of the blockade of the German-leased port of Tsingtao. By late September, the ship was assigned to escort duties in the Indian Ocean and Red Sea. She was transferred to the newly formed Dardanelles Squadron in May 1915, which was tasked to blockade the Aegean coast of Turkey. On the 26th, the cruiser was attacked by Ottoman coastal artillery at Bodrum while inspecting shipping, losing 27 men killed and 11 wounded.

Desaix and Kléber were reactivated in July 1914 and were assigned to the 3rd Light Division ( (DL)) of the 2nd Light Squadron which was tasked to defend the English Channel in conjunction with the British. The division was on station in the western end of the Channel by 4 August, where their mission was to intercept German shipping and provide distant cover for the smaller ships escorting convoys in the Channel. Improved defenses in the Channel and the stabilization of the front in early 1915 allowed the cruisers to be released from their tasks, so Desaix was assigned to the 3rd Squadron upon her arrival in the Eastern Mediterranean on 16 February. The squadron was tasked to patrol the area between Port Said, Egypt, and Alexandretta, Ottoman Syria. The cruiser was detached in May to assist the 1st Naval Army in the Central Mediterranean with searching for German shipping near Italian ports. She rejoined the 3rd Squadron and was tasked to help blockade the Ottoman coast near the Turkish and Syrian border. In contrast to her sister, Kléber was transferred to the Dardanelles to support Allied forces in the Gallipoli Campaign in May where she joined the Dardanelles Squadron together with Dupleix and were assigned to blockade the coast of Asia Minor. Kléber collided with the Royal Australian Navy troopship HMT Boorara in the Aegean Sea on 17 July, damaging her bow. After the Kingdom of Bulgaria joined the Central Powers in mid-October, Kléber was one of the ship tasked to raid the Aegean coast of Bulgaria on 21 October.

The successes of German merchant raiders like  in 1916 caused the Allies to transfer cruisers to the Atlantic to protect their shipping. The sisters were assigned to a newly-raised 6th Light Division in July 1916 that was based in Dakar, French West Africa, with Kléber as the division's flagship. To release manpower for higher-priority patrol boats in 1917, the 6th DL was reduced to Dupleix and Desaix and renamed the Coast of Africa Division on 18 May;  (Rear Admiral) Louis Jaurès transferred his flag to Dupleix. En route to Brest, France, Kléber struck a mine and sank on 27 June that the German U-boat  had laid off the Iroise entrance to Brest. Nearby ships were able to rescue all but 38 of her crew.

The division was disbanded on 14 September and Dupleix sailed to Brest where she was placed in reserve on 15 October. Desaix remained at Dakar for the rest of the war, tasked to escort convoys in the South Atlantic. Dupleix was decommissioned on 1 May 1919 and stricken on 27 September from the Navy List. In 1920 Dupleix was towed to Landévennec and she was sold for scrap in 1922. Desaix returned to France after the war, but was assigned to the Far Eastern Division in 1919. Her service there was uneventful and the ship arrived back in France on 31 March 1921 after which she was decommissioned. Desaix was stricken from the Navy List on 27 July, but was not sold for scrap until 1927.

References

Bibliography

 
 

 
 
 

 
Cruisers of the French Navy
World War I cruisers of France
Ship classes of the French Navy